The Coopérative de Transport Maritime et Aérien (CTMA) is a Canadian transportation company, formed in 1944 to provide maritime and air links to the Magdalen Islands, Quebec.

Labelling itself Groupe CTMA, the company operates the seasonal ferry service from Cap-aux-Meules, Quebec in the Magdalen Islands to Souris, Prince Edward Island using the vessel MV Madeleine.

It also operates a seasonal passenger service from Montreal to Cap-aux-Meules using the vessel , as well as a year-round cargo service from Montreal and Matane, Quebec to Cap-aux-Meules using the vessel .

CTMA also operates a trucking company which hauls cargo to the Magdalen Islands, as well as providing air services.

Routes
C.T.M.A. operate two routes to the Magdalen Islands.

Montreal - Quebec - Chandler - Cap-aux-Meules
Souris - Cap-aux-Meules

Fleet
C.T.M.A. operates a fleet of Roll-on/roll-off passenger vessels (ro-pax).

Gallery of CTMA Fleet

References

External links 

Ferry companies of Quebec
Ferry companies of Prince Edward Island
Companies based in Quebec
Transport in Kings County, Prince Edward Island
Transport in Gaspésie–Îles-de-la-Madeleine
Magdalen Islands